Coins of the United States dollar (aside from those of the earlier Continental currency) were first minted in 1792. New coins have been produced annually and they make up a valuable aspect of the United States currency system. Today, circulating coins exist in denominations of 1¢ (i.e. 1 cent or $0.01), 5¢, 10¢, 25¢, 50¢, and $1.00. Also minted are bullion (including gold, silver and platinum) and commemorative coins. All of these are produced by the United States Mint. The coins are then sold to Federal Reserve Banks which in turn are responsible for putting coins into circulation and withdrawing them as demanded by the country's economy.

Current coinage

Today, four mints operate in the United States producing billions of coins each year. The main mint is the Philadelphia Mint, which produces circulating coinage, mint sets and some commemorative coins. The Denver Mint also produces circulating coinage, mint sets and commemoratives. The San Francisco Mint produces regular and silver proof coinage, and produced circulating coinage until the 1970s. The West Point Mint produces bullion coinage (including proofs). Philadelphia and Denver produce the dies used at all of the mints. The proof and mint sets are manufactured each year and contain examples of all of the year's circulating coins.

The producing mint of each coin may be easily identified, as most coins bear a mint mark. The identifying letter of the mint can be found on the front side of most coins, and is often placed near the year. Unmarked coins are issued by the Philadelphia mint. Among marked coins, Philadelphia coins bear a letter P. Denver coins bear a letter D, San Francisco coins bear a letter S, and West Point coins bear a letter W. S and W coins are rarely found in general circulation, although S coins bearing dates prior to the mid-1970s are in circulation. The CC, O, C, and D mint marks were used on gold and silver coins for various periods from the mid-19th century until the early 20th century by temporary mints in Carson City, Nevada; New Orleans, Louisiana; Charlotte, North Carolina; and Dahlonega, Georgia.  Most such coins that still exist are now in the hands of collectors and museums.

Coins in circulation

Remarks

 The mass and composition of the cent changed to the current copper-plated zinc core in 1982. Both types were minted in 1982 with no distinguishing mark. Cents minted in 1943 were struck on planchets punched from zinc-coated steel which left the resulting edges uncoated. This caused many of these coins to rust. These "steel pennies" are not likely to be found in circulation today, as they were later intentionally removed from circulation for recycling the metal and by collectors. However, cents minted from 1944 to 1946 were made from a special salvaged WWII brass composition to replace the steel cents, but still save material for the war effort, and are more common in circulation than their 1943 counterparts.
 The wheat cent was mainstream and common during its time. Some dates are rare, but many can still be found in circulation. This is partially due to the fact that unlike the formerly silver denominations (dollar, half dollar, quarter, and dime), the composition of the pre-1982 cent, nearly pure copper, is not so much more valuable over face value for it to be hoarded to the extreme extent of the silver denominations.
 Nickels produced from mid-1942 through 1945 were manufactured from 56% copper, 35% silver and 9% manganese. This allowed the saved nickel metal to be shifted to industrial production of military supplies during World War II. Few of these are still found in circulation.
 Prior to 1965 and passage of the Coinage Act of 1965 the composition of the dime, quarter, half-dollar and dollar coins was 90% silver and 10% copper. The half-dollar continued to be minted in a 40% silver-clad composition between 1965 and 1970. Dimes and quarters from before 1965 and half-dollars from before 1971 are generally not in circulation due to being removed for their silver content. Some modern commemorative coins have been minted in the silver dollar denominations.
 In 1975 and 1976 U.S. Bicentennial coinage was minted. Regardless of date of coining, each coin bears the dual date "1776-1976". The Quarter-Dollar, Half-Dollar and Dollar coins were issued in the copper 91.67% nickel 8.33% composition for general circulation and the Government issued six-coin Proof Set. A special three-coin set of 40% silver coins were also issued by the U.S. Mint in both Uncirculated and Proof.
 Use of the half-dollar is not as widespread as that of other coins in general circulation; most Americans use dollar coins, quarters, dimes, nickels and cents only, as these are the only coins most often found in general circulation. When found, many 50¢ coins are quickly hoarded, spent, or brought to banks. As large numbers of half dollars are typically held by banks or available to order, they are often sought after by coin roll hunters for the purpose of searching for silver coins, proofs, and coins not intended for circulation.
 The Presidential Dollar series features portraits of all deceased U.S. Presidents with four coin designs issued each year in the order of the president's inauguration date. These coins began circulating on February 15, 2007. Starting 2012, these coins have been minted only for collectible sets because of a large stockpile.
 The Susan B. Anthony dollar coin was minted from 1979 to 1981 and 1999. The 1999 minting was in response to Treasury supplies of the dollar becoming depleted and the inability to accelerate the minting of the Sacagawea dollars by a year. 1981 Anthony dollars can sometimes be found in circulation from proof sets that were broken open, but these dollars were not minted with the intent that they circulate.
 Although dollar coins have not been struck for circulation since 2011, the American Innovation dollar is considered a circulation coin by the US Mint.
 Since 2019, each American Innovation dollar coin features a different privy mark, changed annually, located just below "IN GOD WE TRUST".

Bullion coins
Non-circulating bullion coins have been produced each year since 1986. They can be found in gold, silver, platinum (since 1997), and palladium (since 2017). The face value of these coins is legal as tender, but does not actually reflect the value of the precious metal contained therein. On May 11, 2011, Utah became the first state to accept these coins as the value of the precious metal in common transactions. The Utah State Treasurer assigns a numerical precious metal value to these coins each week based on the spot metal prices. The bullion coin types include "S" (San Francisco, 1986–1992), "P" (Philadelphia, 1993 – 2000), and "W" (West Point, New York, 2001–present).

Commemorative coins
Modern commemoratives have been minted since 1982. A list is available here.

Mint marks 
List of current and past United States Mint branches and mint marks found on their coins:

Obsolete and canceled coins

 Half cent: ¢, 1793–1857
 Silver center cent: 1¢, 1792 (not circulated)
 Large cent: 1¢, 1793–1857
 Ring cent: 1¢, 1850–1851, 1853, 1884–1885 (not circulated)
 Two-cent billon: 2¢, 1836 (not circulated)
 Two-cent bronze: 2¢, 1863–1873
 Three-cent bronze: 3¢, 1863 (not circulated)
 Three-cent nickel: 3¢, 1865–1889
 Trime (Three-cent silver): 3¢, 1851–1873
 Half dime: 5¢, 1792–1873
 Twenty-cent piece: 20¢, 1875–1878
 Gold dollar: $1.00, 1849–1889 (some early commemoratives were minted in this denomination)
 Quarter eagle: $2.50, 1792–1929 (some early commemoratives were minted in this denomination)
 Three-dollar piece: $3.00, 1854–1889
 Stella: $4.00, 1879–1880 (not circulated)
 Half eagle: $5.00, 1795–1929 (some modern commemoratives are minted in this denomination)
 Eagle: $10.00, 1795–1933 (some modern commemoratives are minted in this denomination)
 Double eagle: $20.00, 1849–1933
 Half-union: $50.00, 1877 (not circulated, some early commemoratives were minted in this denomination)
 Union: $100.00 (planned but not minted, some modern commemoratives are minted in this denomination)

The law governing obsolete, mutilated, and worn coins and currency, including types which are no longer in production (e.g.

Note: It is a common misconception that "eagle"-based nomenclature for gold U.S. coinage was merely slang. The "eagle," "half-eagle" and "quarter-eagle" were specifically given these names in the Coinage Act of 1792. Likewise, the double eagle was specifically created as such by name ("An Act to authorize the Coinage of Gold Dollars and Double Eagles", title and section 1, March 3, 1849).

Mill coins

Legal protections

The alteration or lightening of U.S. coins for fraudulent purposes is illegal. It is generally legal to melt down coins for the use of their constitent metals, but the Treasury Department has occasionally prohibited melting down and mass exportation when the value of the metal exceeds the face value of the coin. This has happened from 1967 to 1969 for silver coins, from 1974 to 1978 for pennies, and since 2006 for pennies and nickels. The use of elongated coin presses is considered legal because it is not for fraudulent purposes.

See also

 50 State Quarters
 California gold coinage
 Federal Reserve Note, for U.S. banknotes
 United States Mint coin sizes
 Penny debate in the United States
 Modern United States commemorative coins
 United States commemorative coin
 United States coinage type set

Notes

References

External links
  of the United States Mint
 Page of 1792 Mint and Coinage Act (Describes the first completely regulated U.S. coinage system)
 "A Peculiar Stamp of Our Owne": The Massachusetts Mint and the Battle over Sovereignty" by Jonathan Barth

 

no:Amerikanske dollarmynter